Robert H. Klonoff is an American attorney and legal scholar working as the Jordan D. Schnitzer Professor of Law at Lewis & Clark Law School in Portland, Oregon. He was previously a class action defense attorney at Jones Day and served as dean of Lewis & Clark Law School from 2007 to 2014.

Early life and education
Originally from Portland, Oregon, Klonoff earned an AB from the University of California, Berkeley in 1976. He was the school's Most Outstanding Political Science Student in 1976 and won the Edward Kraft Award for Outstanding Work as a freshman in 1974.

He graduated from Yale Law School in 1979 and won the Benjamin N. Cardozo Prize for Best Moot Court Brief for Academic Year 1978–1979. While at Yale, he met Supreme Court justice Sonia Sotomayor.

Career
Professor Klonoff was law clerk for Judge John Robert Brown in 1979 and 1980. He served as an assistant United States attorney for the District of Columbia from 1983 to 1986. In 1986, Klonoff became assistant to the solicitor general of the United States. In that position, he argued a number of cases before the United States Supreme Court.

Klonoff was a visiting professor at the University of San Diego School of Law in 1988 and 1989. In 1989, he joined the DC office of Jones Day, where he became a partner in 1991. He remained partner for over a decade until July 2003, when he became of Ccunsel. Klonoff remained at Jones Day until 2007.

Klonoff specialized in defense-side class action at Jones Day. The firm is considered a top class action defense firm, and has won jury verdicts for tobacco companies. The firm also successfully represented energy companies in obtaining a dismissal of a claim made by a Native American tribe in Alaska that global warming was threatening their coastal village. While at Jones Day, Klonoff was also an adjunct professor at Georgetown University Law Center. He continued to handle Supreme Court litigation and also specialized in class action cases, and served as chair of the firm's pro bono program.

In 2003, he joined the faculty of the University of Missouri–Kansas City School of Law as the Douglas Stripp/Missouri Endowed Professor of Law. He became dean and professor of law of Lewis & Clark Law School in 2007.

Klonoff's academic work includes publications in the fields of class actions, trial and appellate advocacy, and aggregate litigation. He is the senior author of a leading casebook on class actions, and the author of the Thomson West Nutshell on class actions. He is also the co-author of a leading text on trial advocacy and co-author of a Thomson West Nutshell on federal appellate practice. In addition, he has written numerous articles on class actions and other topics.

Klonoff has lectured throughout the United States and in several foreign countries on class actions and appellate litigation. He is a member of the American Law Institute (ALI) and serves as an Associate Reporter for the ALI's class action project, "Principles of the Law of Aggregate Litigation." Klonoff is a Fellow in the American Academy of Appellate Lawyers and served as a reporter for the 2005 National Conference on Appellate Justice. He is an advisory board consulting editor of Class Action Litigation Report (BNA).

In 2011, Klonoff was named by Supreme Court Chief Justice John Roberts as the academic member of the Advisory Committee on Civil Rules. The committee is responsible for crafting the Federal Rules of Civil Procedure. Klonoff was reappointed to the Committee in 2014.

In 2012, Klonoff posted a draft version of his article The Decline of Class Actions on SSRN. The article, which will appear in final form in the University of Washington Law Review, takes a comprehensive look at trends in the law of class actions over the past several decades, concluding that the jurisprudence has led federal courts to view class actions with increasing skepticism. The article has been the subject of commentary on several blogs that focus on class action litigation.

On October 12, 2013, Klonoff announced that he would be stepping down as dean at the end of the academic year (June 2014). Klonoff's letter to the president outlined his accomplishments as dean and noted that he would take a sabbatical and then return to the school as a professor and a scholar.

Books
Federal Appellate Practice and Procedure in a Nutshell. Thomson West 2008.
 Winning Jury Trials: Trial Tactics and Sponsorship Strategies. 3rd Edition, NITA 2007.
Class Actions and Other Multi-Party Litigation in a Nutshell. 3rd Edition, Thomson West 2007.
Class Actions and Other Multi-Party Litigation: Cases and Materials. 2nd Edition, Thomson West 2006.
Sponsorship Strategy: Evidentiary Tactics for Winning Jury Trials. Michie Co., 1990.

References

Living people
Deans of law schools in the United States
University of California, Berkeley alumni
Yale Law School alumni
Lawyers from Portland, Oregon
Lewis & Clark College faculty
1955 births